Rolf von Nauckhoff (1909–1968) was a Swedish film actor who worked mainly in Germany.

Selected filmography

 Johan Ulfstjerna (1936) - Student reading a poem (uncredited)
 Shipwrecked Max (1936) - Waiter
 All Lies (1938) - Paul, Rechtsanwalt
 Hurrah! I'm a Father (1939) - Freund von Peter
 Duel with Death (1949) - Dr. Ernst Romberg
 White Gold (1949) - Ing. Hopkins
 The Orplid Mystery (1950) - Pastor Johannes Klappstein
 The Man Who Wanted to Live Twice (1950) - Dr. Ihlenfeld
 Crown Jewels (1950) - Minister
 Die Tat des Anderen (1951)
 Die Sehnsucht des Herzens (1951) - Chefarzt Dr. Thomas
 Begierde (1951) - Martin Reval
 The Lady in Black (1951) - Henry Richards
 The Clang of the Pick (1952) - Gert Willenhart
 Man on a Tightrope (1953) - Police Agent (uncredited)
 A Heart Plays False (1953) - Direktor Hersbach
 Red Roses, Red Lips, Red Wine (1953) - Kunsthändler Thormann
 Love's Awakening (1953) - Peter von Prahm, Reitlehrer
 Stars Over Colombo (1953) - Pahana
 The Prisoner of the Maharaja (1954) - Pahana
 Captain Wronski (1954) - SS-Unterführer
 Operation Edelweiss (1954) - Eike Rasmussen
 A Double Life (1954) - Professeur Werner
The Blacksmith of St. Bartholomae (1955) - Pater Bernhard
 A Girl Without Boundaries (1955)
 Vor 100 Jahren fing es an (1956)
 Liane, Jungle Goddess (1956) - Prof. Danner
 Rübezahl (1957) - Ein Gast
 Nature Girl and the Slaver (1957) - Professor Danner
 Between Munich and St. Pauli (1957) - Polizeikommissar in Hamburg
 The Doctor of Stalingrad (1958) - Oberst Eklund, Schwedisches Rotes Kreuz
 Heiße Ware (1959) - Kriminalbeamter
 Crime After School (1959)
 Arzt aus Leidenschaft (1959) - Kriminalinspektor Krüger
 La Vache et le Prisonnier (1959) - Deutscher Hauptmann auf der Brücke (uncredited)
 Oriental Nights (1960)
 Mistress of the World (1960) - Dalkin
 ...und keiner schämte sich (1960) - Dr. Berger
 Mal drunter - mal drüber (1960) - Fluglehrer
 Question 7 (1961) - Karl Marschall - Kirchenältester
 The Magic Fountain (1961) - Sir Phillip
 Liane, die Tochter des Dschungels (1961)
 Die blonde Frau des Maharadscha (1962) - Pahana
 Two Bavarians in Bonn (1962) - Familienminister
 Encounter in Salzburg (1964) - Hiesemann
 Der Chef wünscht keine Zeugen (1964)
 La isla de la muerte (1967) - James Robinson
 Das Rasthaus der grausamen Puppen (1967) - Jack Oland
 Schrei nach Lust (1968) - (final film role)

References

Bibliography
 Peter Cowie & Derek Elley. World Filmography: 1967. Fairleigh Dickinson University Press, 1977.

External links

1909 births
1968 deaths
Swedish male film actors
Male actors from Stockholm
Swedish emigrants to Germany